Black Potts Ait is an island in the River Thames in England near Windsor, Berkshire. It is on the reach between Old Windsor Lock and Romney Lock and carries Black Potts Railway Bridge

The island is a tree-covered triangle which is now at the mouth of the Jubilee River. It was a favourite area for fishing for Charles II, Henry Wotton and John Hales.

See also
Islands in the River Thames

References

Islands of Berkshire
Islands of the River Thames